Gopal Nilkanth Dandekar aka Appa Dandekar (8 July 1916 – 1 June 1998) was a Marathi writer from Maharashtra, India.

Dandekar was born in Paratwada in Amravati district.

He grew up in Vidarbha but ran away from his home in Nagpur at age thirteen in response to Mahatma Gandhi's call to young people for joining his movement for India's attainment of freedom from the British Raj. After spending a few years in extreme poverty, he found some stability with a few patrons. Later he joined Rashtriya Svayamsevak Sangh and worked as a volunteer in Gadge Maharaj's social service movement. He traveled extensively.

Awards and honors
In 1976, Dandekar received a Sahitya Akademi Award for his autobiographical work Smaran Gatha. He was elected president of Marathi Sahitya Sammelan held at Akola in 1981. He received an honorary D.Litt. degree from Pune University on 30 December 1992.

Personal life
Dandekar and his wife Neera Dandekar have a daughter, Veena Dev. Veena has two daughters: Marathi actress Mrinal Kulkarni, and Madhura.

Works

Autobiography
 Smaran Gatha

Novels

 Shitu
 Pavanakathacha Dhondi (1955)
 Padaghavli (Novel concerning a Brahmin family in coastal Maharashtra. It describes the lifestyle there in the 18th century.) (1956)
 Machivarala Budha (1958)
 Zunjar Machi
 Kuna Ekachi Bhramangatha
 Purnamaychi Lekare
 Ranbhuli
 Chhand Maze Vegle
 Tambadphuti
 Mrunmayi
 Aamhi Bhagirathache Putra (Novel based on the construction of Bhakra-Nangal dam on river Satlaj)
 Jait-Re-jait (A film based on this novel was later made by Jabbar Patel.)
 Baya Dar Ughad (Part 1 of 5 novels on Raja Shivaji's Maharashtra)
 Har Har Mahaadev (Part 2 of 5 novels on Raja Shivaji's Maharashtra)
 Daryabhavani (Part 3 of 5 novels on Raja Shivaji's Maharashtra)
 Zunzarmachi (Part 4 of 5 novels on Raja Shivaji's Maharashtra)
 He To Shrinchi Ichchha (Part 5 of 5 novels on Raja Shivaji's Maharashtra)
 Rumaalee Rahasya
 Tya Tithe Rukhatali
 Waagharu
 Karnaayan
 ShriRamayan
 Tudavalele Gharkul
 " Bhillaveer Kalinga" a historical story/novel on Tribes of Narmada Banks.
 Krishnawedh
 "Aai Chi Denagi" 8 volumes of motivational stories from Indian History for children

Travelogues
 Durga Bhramangatha (Concerrning wanderings among the hill forts of Maharashtra)
 Durga Darshan ( Concerrning wanderings among the hill forts of Maharashtra)
 Kille (Informative book about trekking routes in Sahyadri)
 Maharashtrachi DharaTirthe (Informative book about forts in Maharashtra)
 Maharashtra Darshan (Informative book about Maharashtra, especially the rural parts).
 Narmadechya Tataaki
 Dakshin Waara

Biographical works
Mogara Phulala (Based on the life and works of  Dnyaneshwar)
Das Dongari Rahato (Based on the life and works of Ramdas Swami)
Anandvan Bhuvani 
Tuka Akaashaaevdhaa (Novel based on the life and works of Tukaram)
The Last Kirtan of Gadage Baba
Waadalatil Deepstambh (Novel based on  story of Keshav Baliram Hedgewar the founder of Rashtriya Swayamsevek Sangh)
Devaki Nandan Gopaalaa
"Shree gadge maharaj"  (the biography of maharashtras saint -majestic prakashan-pablisher book  )

References

1916 births
1998 deaths
Marathi-language writers
Recipients of the Sahitya Akademi Award in Marathi
People from Amravati district
20th-century Indian poets
Indian male poets
Poets from Maharashtra
20th-century Indian male writers
Presidents of the Akhil Bharatiya Marathi Sahitya Sammelan